Tenor Conclave is a studio album by John Coltrane, Hank Mobley, Al Cohn, and Zoot Sims. It was recorded in 1956 and issued in early 1957 by Prestige Records.

Prestige re-released it in 1962 with a different cover more prominently displaying Coltrane's name. This reissue of the album was given the catalogue number PRLP 7249.

Track listing
 "Tenor Conclave" (Mobley) — 11:05
 "Just You, Just Me" (Jesse Greer, Raymond Klages) — 9:29
 "Bob's Boys" (Hank Mobley) — 8:26
 "How Deep Is the Ocean" (Irving Berlin) — 15:04

Personnel
 Al Cohn, John Coltrane, Hank Mobley, Zoot Sims — tenor saxophone
 Red Garland — piano
 Paul Chambers — bass
 Art Taylor — drums

References

1957 albums
John Coltrane albums
Hank Mobley albums
Al Cohn albums
Zoot Sims albums
Paul Chambers albums
Prestige Records albums